Standon is a village and civil parish in Hertfordshire, England. The parish includes the adjoining village of Puckeridge. The village church of St Mary has Saxon origins with much Victorian restoration. It contains the ornate tomb of the Tudor courtier Sir Ralph Sadler.

The Prime Meridian passes to the west of Standon.

The place-name is first attested in a Saxon charter of 944–46 AD and means "stony hill".

Standon village has many local facilities. In addition to the church, there is a village hall, two public houses, a Chinese restaurant, post office, butcher, baker, and newsagent. Villagers also make frequent use of facilities in neighbouring Puckeridge, which include a pharmacy, estate agent, petrol station, public houses, doctor's surgery and primary schools (including St Thomas of Canterbury, a Roman Catholic primary school).

Arthur Martin-Leake, one of only three men to be awarded the Victoria Cross twice, was born in the village.

The Standon Calling music festival is held in the village.

Standon features in the novel The House on Boulby Cliff by Kevin Corby Bowyer, one-time organist of St Mary's Church.

See also
The Hundred Parishes

References

External links

 Standon (A Guide to Old Hertfordshire)

Villages in Hertfordshire
Civil parishes in Hertfordshire